Marit Haraldsen (born 25 July 1939) is a Norwegian alpine skier. She participated at the 1960 Winter Olympics in Squaw Valley, where she competed in downhill, slalom and giant slalom.

She became Norwegian champion in downhill in 1959.

References

External links

 

1939 births
Living people
Alpine skiers from Oslo
Norwegian female alpine skiers
Olympic alpine skiers of Norway
Alpine skiers at the 1960 Winter Olympics